Posht Tang-e Chenaran (also Romanized as Posht Tang-e Chenārān; also known as Posht Tang) is a village in Shirez Rural District, Bisotun District, Harsin County, Kermanshah Province, Iran. At the 2006 census, its population was 96, in 19 families.

References 

Populated places in Harsin County